Vroom, Inc. is a New York City-based used car retailer and e-commerce company that lets consumers buy, sell, and finance cars online.

History
The company was founded in August 2013 by Kevin Westfall and Marshall Chesrown as AutoAmerica. In November 2014, Elie Wurtman and Allon Bloch joined as co-founders to transform the company into a technological platform and the company was renamed Vroom. It also has a refurbishment facility in Stafford, Texas and was included on Forbes’ list of the Hottest E-Commerce Startups of 2015.  Vroom's current CEO is Tom Shortt. He succeeded Paul Hennessy, who was previously the CEO of Priceline.com.

In December 2015, the company acquired Texas Direct Auto, a Houston-based company founded in 2002 that is now owned by Vroom but operates as a separate brand. The combined company is profitable and reached $900 million in revenue in 2015.  In February 2018, Vroom closed operations in its Whitestown, Indiana facility and laid off approximately 25% of its staff in the New York City and Stafford, Texas locations.  In December 2018, Vroom closed a Series G financing round of $146 million led by AutoNation and began scaling its operations again.

Products
Rather than functioning as a peer-to-peer marketplace, Vroom is an e-commerce service that handles the entire transaction with no-haggle pricing.  The company offers financing from more than 12 banks and delivers cars to customers nationwide.  All cars that Vroom sells are reconditioned and the company uses proprietary RFID tracking and prioritization software to automate the refurbishment process.  Vroom provides a seven-day money back guarantee on purchases and a 90-day bumper-to-bumper warranty.  Vroom also buys cars from customers, who can receive a cash voucher after submitting photos and information about the car online.

Funding
Vroom has raised $440 million in total funding.  Investors include AutoNation, L Catterton, General Catalyst Partners, Allen & Company, T. Rowe Price, John Elway, Steve Berrard (former CEO of Blockbuster and AutoNation), Cascade Investments (the investment holding company of Microsoft founder Bill Gates), Jeffery Boyd (chairman of The Priceline Group), Bob Mylod (former CFO of The Priceline Group), PICO Venture Partners, Elie Wurtman, Allon Bloch, and Dan Gilbert (Owner of Cleveland Cavaliers & Quicken Loans).

References

External links
 

2013 establishments in New York City
Retail companies established in 2013
Internet properties established in 2013
American companies established in 2013
Online automotive companies of the United States
Online marketplaces of the United States
Auto dealerships of the United States
Automotive websites
2020 initial public offerings
Publicly traded companies based in New York City
Companies listed on the Nasdaq
Used car market